Wartenberg's syndrome is a specific mononeuropathy, caused by entrapment of the superficial branch of the radial nerve. Symptoms include numbness, tingling, and weakness of the posterior aspect of the thumb. Also called Cheiralgia paresthetica.

It is not to be confused with Wartenberg's migratory sensory neuropathy, Waardenburg syndrome, or Lateral medullary syndrome (known as Wallenberg's Syndrome). Also not to be confused with Wartenberg's sign, which relates to entrapment of the ulnar nerve in the cubital tunnel.

Notes 

Peripheral nervous system disorders
Syndromes